Baseball in the Tampa Bay area, both amateur and professional, has had a long and storied history, even though the Tampa Bay Rays are one of the two youngest franchises in Major League Baseball, the other being the Arizona Diamondbacks.

Spring training
In 1913, the Chicago Cubs moved their spring training site to the city of Tampa.  St. Petersburg soon followed, becoming a spring training host for the first time in 1914 when the St. Louis Browns came to town.

St. Petersburg
Since 1914, more Major League spring training games have been played in St. Petersburg than any other city.

*Note: In 1951, the New York Giants, whose normal spring training site was in Phoenix, Arizona, swapped locations with the New York Yankees so Yankees' co-owner Del Webb could oversee both his team and a growing real estate business concurrently.  The teams returned to their typical training sites in 1952.

Tampa
Tampa has hosted spring training for seven teams: the Boston Red Sox, Chicago Cubs, Chicago White Sox, Cincinnati Reds, Detroit Tigers, Washington Senators, and the New York Yankees, who currently call Tampa their spring training home.

Clearwater

Dunedin
Dunedin has been the only spring training home to the Toronto Blue Jays since the franchise's inception.

Tarpon Springs

Plant City

Minor leagues

Past
The Tampa Bay area has had a long association with minor league baseball. The first modern example was the 1919 Tampa Smokers, a charter member of the original Class D Florida State League (FSL). The expansion St. Petersburg Saints joined the FSL in 1920. After the Smokers folded in 1954, the Tampa Tarpons played in the FSL from 1957 until 1989.

Tampa, St. Petersburg, and other nearby communities also fielded teams in a variety of defunct minor leagues, including the Florida International League, the Florida State Negro League, and the short-lived Florida West Coast League.

Present
The Tampa Bay area is currently home to five teams in Low-A Southeast, a Low-A circuit which effectively replaced the Class-A Advanced Florida State League following the 2021 reorganization of Minor League Baseball: the Tampa Tarpons, Clearwater Threshers, Dunedin Blue Jays, Bradenton Marauders, and Lakeland Flying Tigers. Several major league organizations also field squads in the rookie-level Gulf Coast League and the Florida Instructional League.

Besides hosting actual baseball games, the corporate offices of Minor League Baseball have been located in St. Petersburg since 1973.

Other professional leagues
St. Petersburg was the home of the St. Petersburg Pelicans in the short-lived Senior Professional Baseball Association in 1989–1990.  The league featured former major league players who were age 35 or older.  The Pelicans won the only league championship.

College baseball
Several notable ballplayers have come from the college and university baseball programs in the Tampa Bay Area. Players and managers have reached the Major Leagues from the University of South Florida, University of Tampa, St. Petersburg College and Eckerd College. Other schools in the area with baseball programs include Pasco-Hernando Community College, Saint Leo University, and Hillsborough Community College.

The University of Tampa Spartans baseball program has won eight Division II national championships: 1992, 1993, 1998, 2006, 2007, 2013, 2015, and 2019.

Amateur baseball
Amateur baseball also has a long tradition in the Tampa Bay area. This tradition began in the ballfields of Ybor City and West Tampa, two neighborhoods founded in the late 1800s by immigrants from Cuba, Spain, and Italy. The neighborhoods were home to many social clubs, many of which sponsored highly competitive teams that inspired much local support.

Today, high school and AAU baseball in the area is very competitive, with many players drafted out of high school into the major leagues every year.

Little League Baseball teams from the area have excelled in the Little League World Series, finishing as Runners-Up in the 1948, 1975, 1980 & 1981 Little League World Series tournaments. Tampa Bay area teams have won the state Little League tournament in 1967, 1969–1975, 1977, 1980–1981, 1988–1991, 1994, 2006, 2008, 2011, and 2012. In addition, local teams have won Junior League championships in 1982, 1985, 2004, and 2011.

Little League Baseball's headquarters for the Southern Region was located in Gulfport until 2009.

Notable baseball players from the Tampa Bay area
Al López, the first area native to play and manage in the major leagues and the first to be enshrined in the Baseball Hall of Fame, came out of the leagues of Ybor City in the early 20th century.  Since then, many current and former major league players and managers such as Lou Piniella, Fred McGriff, Gary Sheffield, Tino Martinez, Luis Gonzalez, Dwight Gooden, Howard Johnson, Brad Radke, Craig Lefferts, Tony La Russa, Matt Joyce, Chone Figgins, Ryan Raburn, Hall of Famer Wade Boggs and Steve Garvey (among many others) have gotten their start on local baseball programs around the area.

Tampa Baseball Museum
The Tampa Baseball Museum is being developed by the Ybor City Museum Society and will cover more than 130 years of Tampa's baseball history. It will be a place to celebrate the Tampa Bay area's rich baseball history with memorabilia and exhibits. The museum building was once the childhood home of Al López, Tampa's first Major League player, manager, and Hall of Fame inductee. The house was moved to its present location across the street from the Ybor City State Museum and has been completely rehabilitated. The Tampa Baseball Museum will open once exhibits are completed and installed.

References

Further reading

 

Tampa
Tampa
Sports in the Tampa Bay area